Northenden railway station in Sharston, Manchester, England, was built by the Stockport, Timperley and Altrincham Junction Railway (ST&AJ) and opened for passenger and goods traffic on 1 February 1866.

On 15 August 1867 the ST&AJ became part of the Cheshire Lines Committee, from 1 January 1923 jointly owned by the London and North Eastern Railway and the London, Midland and Scottish Railway.

Some railway timetables describe the station as Northenden for Wythenshawe because, lying between the road overbridges at Sharston Road and Longley Lane, it served the two districts.

Station facilities

The main brick-built station building was constructed to a typical Cheshire Lines Committee design with steeply sloping roofs and decorative wooden barge boarding.  It contained the booking office, passenger waiting room, parcels office, toilet facilities and the station master's accommodation. Until the 1890s a telegraph office, available to send public messages, was located in the station building.

The main building was located on the north side of the line, and therefore was nearest to Northenden village and served passenger trains travelling eastwards from Liverpool and Warrington towards Stockport.

On the south side of the line was a smaller brick-built building containing a waiting room for passengers, and reached from the station's eastern end by a boarded railway crossing. This platform served passenger trains from Stockport travelling westwards towards Warrington and Liverpool.

Northenden Junction and signal box

Northenden Junction signal box is 200 yards (183 metres) to the east of where the main station buildings were, on the north side of the line, adjoining Longley Lane. The signal box was built using CLC's standard dark  brick construction and utilised an unusually tall design, sufficiently high to enable the signalman on duty to readily see above Longley Lane road bridge over the line and on to Northenden Junction, 200 yards (183 m) away to the east, where the London & North Western Railway's line from Stockport (Edgeley) station joined the Cheshire Lines Committee line from Stockport Tiviot Dale. The signal box controlled sets of signals protecting the junction and also operated the powered railway switching points.

Passenger train service
From its opening in 1866, Northenden station was served by local CLC passenger trains from Stockport Tiviot Dale to Altrincham, Warrington Central and Liverpool Central stations.

The London and North Western Railway (LNWR) opened its line from Stockport Edgeley, via Cheadle LNW to Northenden on 1 August 1866. Between that date and 1917, the LNWR operated a passenger train service from Stockport (Edgeley) and on to Broadheath and Warrington Arpley, thence to Liverpool Lime street. These trains used the Northenden Line Junction to Cheadle Village Junction curve in Stockport to access the line to Northenden (see adjacent map).

During the late 19th century, the CLC operated five trains per day from Stockport Tiviot Dale, stopping at Northenden and continuing via Deansgate Junction near Broadheath to Altrincham. The trains were timed to connect at Altrincham with the CLC trains from Manchester Central to Northwich and Chester.

Until 1939, some express trains running through Sheffield Victoria along the Woodhead Line used the route from Godley East through Northenden to bypass Manchester, including some LNER Hull to Liverpool trains. These trains did not stop at the station.

The weekday westbound CLC local train service in July 1922 comprised four trains to Warrington or Liverpool and five to Altrincham. By August 1946, the service to Altrincham had ceased and just four passenger trains per weekday ran to Warrington Central and Liverpool Central. The January 1956 passenger service was at the same sparse level.

For most of the station's existence, the passenger trains were hauled by steam locomotives, but for some years leading up to the second World War, some services from Stockport via Northenden to Altrincham were operated by the CLC's own fleet of Sentinel steam railcars. Northenden station was closed on 30 November 1964  when passenger trains were withdrawn by British Railways and the buildings were later demolished. Passenger trains using Diesel multiple units still operate through the disused site, but these are now from Manchester Piccadilly via Stockport, then travelling non-stop to Navigation Road and onwards to Altrincham, Northwich and Chester.

Freight services

A two-line goods siding was located to the south of the westbound platform. This was served by local freight trains, which shunted the sidings each day.  The goods facilities at Northenden were withdrawn on 19 June 1965. The sidings remained in use for various cement manufacturing companies over the years including Blue Circle Cement and later Lafarge.

Until the early 1960s there was a very intensive service of freight trains through Northenden, with trains heading from Yorkshire and the North Midlands to Liverpool Docks and Birkenhead Docks and elsewhere. Local freight trains stopped at Northenden each day, with goods wagons containing coal and other materials being shunted into the sidings for unloading by local merchants and businesses.

A large waste disposal terminal was constructed to the south of the junction in the mid-1970s. This being the property of Greater Manchester County Council (until 1986; since 1986 GMW). This two-line siding continues in use for the dispatch of container trains carrying landfill refuse. The destination for these being Roxby Gullet near Scunthorpe, North Lincolnshire

Diesel-hauled freight trains still run through Northenden. These include heavy block trains carrying limestone from quarries at Tunstead (near Buxton) Derbyshire to the alkali works located near Northwich, Cheshire.

Railway diagram showing Northenden station and junction

See also

References

Notes

Bibliography

External links

Northenden station at Disused Stations site record

Disused railway stations in Manchester
Former Cheshire Lines Committee stations
Railway stations in Great Britain opened in 1866
Railway stations in Great Britain closed in 1964
Beeching closures in England
1866 establishments in England